El Fener is a neighbourhood of Escaldes-Engordany, Andorra.

Populated places in Andorra
Escaldes-Engordany